Biltmore Village Cottage District is a national historic district located at Asheville, Buncombe County, North Carolina.  The district encompasses 14 contributing residential buildings in Biltmore Village.  They were designed by Richard Sharp Smith and built about 1900 for George W. Vanderbilt.  The dwellings are 1 1/2- to two-story, pebbledash finished half-timbered cottages with recessed porches, multiple gables, steeply pitched roofs, simple molded trim, one or more brick chimneys, and brick foundations.

It was listed on the National Register of Historic Places in 1979.

Gallery

References

External links

Houses on the National Register of Historic Places in North Carolina
Historic districts on the National Register of Historic Places in North Carolina
Houses completed in 1900
Houses in Asheville, North Carolina
National Register of Historic Places in Buncombe County, North Carolina
Vanderbilt family residences